Zoé Kézako is a French animated television series, adapted from Véronique Saüquière's book series published by Frimousse. The first season was produced by Corinne Kouper at Sparkling; the second season was produced at TeamTO. Zoe Kezako aired on Nick Jr. in the United States on March 3, 2006 and ended on February 21, 2014.

This second season is currently airing in France on TF1 and Télétoon. The series is also broadcast around the world: in Norway (NRK1), Sweden (SVT), Denmark (DR), Italy (Rai 3), Canada (Radio Canada), Belgium (RTBF and Ketnet), Portugal (RTP), Finland (YLE), Ireland (RTÉ), Latin America (HBO Family), Qatar (JeemTV), Argentina (Pakapaka) and in the United States (Nick Jr.) and (Qubo).

Overview
A big round face with two springy pigtails on top, and a gangly body dressed in a stripy shirt, red tunic-dress and speedy sneakers. Zoé Kézako the TV series features the adventures of this irresistible little girl, with stacks of humour and piles of energy. The fruit of Véronique Saüquère's imagination.

Just like all kids her age (7 and three quarters), Zoé asks herself many questions and is not always sure how to act in certain situations. Nothing could be more natural - after all, the one thing she doesn’t have is... experience!

From one episode to the next, Zoé gains vital experience for daily life. Each individual story is a slice of livingness, a portion of knowledge we all need to get a grasp of the world and the people around us. The understanding that helps us grow up, just at the right speed. Until, one fine day, we suddenly realize that: Life is a big heap of fun!

Characters

Main characters
 Zoe Kezako: 7 ¾ years old, Zoé hates anything that gets in the way of her daily routine or that disturbs her countless capricious moods. Indeed, this is the age where anything that is not your own, doesn’t concern you or revolve around you should just not exist: her two best friends are now spending far too much time together, strangers walk in during her favourite television show, etc.  And, unlike other children, Zoé expresses it! She is straightforward and without any hang-ups, right up there with the greats, such as Calvin (from Calvin and Hobbes), Zazie or Mafalda. She wants it all! Like many kids her age, Zoé is going through her “center of the world” phase.
 Mariponpon Glutton: Mariponpon is more than just a “greedy piggy”! Mariponpon is as easy going and care free as Zoé is pestering. She isn’t very hard-to-please: she’ll go where it's bright and shiny (an ice-cream stand, a merry-go-round, etc.). She finds everything and everyone positively delightful. She is very reconciling, so much so that she doesn’t even know there's a problem in the first place. In fact, she has no opinion of her own. Everything's just “fine and dandy”, ALL the time! The only time she ever gets mad is if she's going along with Zoé, or because Zoé has pushed her over the edge. In other words, the rare times she loses it, she does so unwillingly.
  Tony Dingo: Tony is the local clown; he also happens to be Zoé's neighbour. This kind-hearted loony who’ll do anything to annoy people (he tangles himself up in other people's jump-ropes on purpose, throws papier-mâché balls in class, etc.). Sometimes, even in his sleep, he happens to break stuff lying next to him. He's completely unruly. Tony's got a deep sway in his walk and he wears a hat and overalls filled with holes. He's always in good spirits and bursting with energy. Left to his own devices, he's insolent and a little edgy, bur deeply human. At times he can show signs of kindness and generosity, but he quickly finds himself back his craziness. In a word, Tony is totally going through “the dumb age”.
  Super Duper: Born in a distant country populated with kangaroos, he is the new star of the school. He is constantly glued to his speaker tuned to his favourite radio station, and always saying hype expressions like “you crack me up, dude”. He's always got the latest clothes, the coolest gadgets, amazing roller-blades, not to mention his delicious British-sounding accent. Awesome! To make matters worse, he's often trailing Zoé. That's because he's CRRRazy about Melina (who, on the other hand, couldn’t give a damn about him), who spends every Wednesday afternoon at Zoé's house in account of the fact that her mom has asked Zoé's mom to give her extra French lessons!
  Melina : All Melina ever thinks about is African dancing and setting the most sadistic of traps for everyone, in conjunction with Zoé!! And yet she is quite obviously the most gifted pupil in the class, which explains why everybody (parents, teachers and, basically, anyone in their right mind!) is convinced she is a future candidate for the most exclusive of universities. Melina is a mystery to everyone who knows her! Despite being extremely smart and first in class without lifting a single finger, Melina loooves picking her nose, sticking whoopee cushions on the teacher's chair or devising the craziest of traps, with the purpose of ridiculing anyone and everyone around her! Even Zoé sometimes thinks she goes too far!
  Jeny : Tightly fitted up to the neck and over-accessorized, and overwhelmed by her adoration for the terrible singer Gino, Jeny walks around listening to her walkman and carrying her flashy notebooks. However, Jeny does not belong to Zoé's circle of friends because she never stops talking! She speaks about how popular she is and of her “best friends” all day long, but she really doesn’t have any. No one seems to want to be associated with her. Ironically, she has a huge crush in Tony Dingo who happens to be the most unapproachable boy of them all. Jeny is neither bitter, dumb or bent on revenge. She just wants people to pay attention to her.
 Machine: Machine is the coolest baby sitter. Everyone loves her. Every time she picks up Zoé for school, it's a huge event! She's totally crazy and knows exactly how to make everyone laugh. She's always running around and making jokes. Her face is covered with pimples and she wears humongous braces. She dreams of becoming a Hollywood star! One day, she’ll break the piggy-bank and make the big trip! In the meantime, she spends a lot of time scanning audition magazines, hoping to find a role in a commercial, a sitcom or a movie. She even sometimes gets Zoé and Titi to help her rehearse scenes.
  Dad and Mom: Zoé's parents are the only symbols of authority (“time for dinner!”, or “get dressed, we’re going to grandma’s!!”). Zoé's mom is a young, beautiful and gracious woman, fair, open-minded, a bit eccentric, very cool and always smiling. Dad, who loves his wife, is a little bit more down to earth.

Secondary characters
 Titi: Titi, Zoé's brother, is a little piece of sticky tape that won’t get off your fingers! He lives his life constantly stuck to Zoé, and making noise all around her, tearing apart her notebooks and chewing on her super-cool pens. He's Zoé's worst nightmare in diapers.
 Mr. Bonbec: Mr. Bonbec sells candy in his colourful boutique. He is the children's great friend and never hesitates to give out candies, to be comforting and to give advice. The children seek him out like a true sage.
 Miss Lardon: Being so delicate and sentimental, Miss Lardon is easily overwhelmed by her pupils. She also often finds amusing methods for explaining math or science. She loves romantic poetry and is easily moved when speaking of love.
 Mrs. Glouton: Mariponpon's mother is a generous woman, in every sense of the word. She seems to create a wonderful living experience for her daughter, probably to compensate for her father's absence. A true garden of Eden, packed full of toys, games, meals, snacks, costumes, etc.

Episodes

Pilot season

First season

Second season

Awards
International Animation Festival « Cartoons on the Bay » 2005: Pulcinella Award for the Best Children Series
International Animation Festival « Cartoons on the Bay » 2005: Pulcinella Award for the Best Character
Chicago International Animation Festival 2005 : Second prize for Best Animated Series (adult jury)
Chicago International Animation Festival 2005 : Excellence certificate (young jury)
Paris Audiovisual Club 2005 : Laurier of the Best Children Program
Festival du Film de Télévision de Luchon 2005 : Award of the 8-12 y.o. category
Nomination at the international Emmy Awards (New-York) 2005

Publishing
 Frimousse Publishing :
 Truc Machin est né !
 L'anniversaire d'enfer !
 Lola-Canon-du-Square
 Valentin mon Amoureux
 C'est meilleur chez Mariponpon Glouton
 « Super-Crâneur »,le nouveau de la classe
 Chez Ginette Couptif
 Machine, baby-sitter trop super !
 M. Pipo, Père Noël pour de faux
 M. et Mme Truc Machin Bidule ont sonné !
 Mamie Cadeau
 On embauche Mme Trucmuche
 Tony Dingo, « le Roi des Barjots » !
 La Petite Zouris
Le Sorbier Publishing :
 Zoé trop zinzin
 Le Cétoutmoi de Zoé Kézako

Hachette Books has been publishing the series’ episodes as short stories within the collection “Ma Première Bibliothèque Rose”:
Moi Zoé, l’amie d’une star
J’ai des supers pouvoirs
Tony J’ai juste un peu triché
J’ai un méga secret
C’est moi qui enquête
J’ai une copine d’enfer
La reine du baby-sitting
Je déteste les garçons

Hachette has also published “Zoé’s tricks and tips”, released in August 2008.

Licensing and merchandising
A line of Zoé Kézako merchandising products (such as dolls, sofas and pillows) is currently being developed with TF1 Licences and SIMBA, to be released in 2009.

References

External links
 Zoé on Véronique Sauquère’s website 
 

2004 French television series debuts
2006 French television series endings
2000s French animated television series
French children's animated television series
Animated television series about children